Ballybeen, also known as Ballybeen Housing Estate, is the second-biggest housing estate in Northern Ireland. It is in the village of Dundonald, on the outskirts of east Belfast. It lies within the townlands of Ballybeen and Carrowreagh, between the Newtownards Road and Comber Road. Started in 1963, and mostly completed by 1971, the estate consists of some 2,400 dwellings. Most of the street names are Scottish in origin (Enler and Brooklands being the exception) as the architects who designed the estates layout mostly came from Scotland. It lies within the Borough of Castlereagh and the Belfast East Parliamentary and Assembly constituency. In the 2001 census the area had a population of 9,170.

It is mainly a Protestant area, although before 1970 and the onset of The Troubles, about 20 per cent of the population were Catholic. During The Troubles the estate became a loyalist stronghold. Andy Tyrie, Ulster Army Council leader and commander of the Ulster Defence Association in the 1970s, was from the estate.

The estate was named after the nearby townland of Ballybeen, home to the Robb family of farmers and landowners. The Robb family house, which then became the Housing Executive offices, was knocked down when the Housing Executive relocated to their new premises at the junction of Robbs road and Church Road in the late 1980s. "Esker", the house that was built to accommodate the growing Robb family still stands today at the junction of Rank road and Church Road.

BBC Radio 5 Live personality (and former BBC Radio 1 DJ) Colin Murray lived in the estate for a few years in Enler Park.

References

Geography of Belfast
Townlands of County Down
Housing estates in Northern Ireland
Civil parish of Comber
Civil parish of Dundonald, County Down